The 2018 Almaty Challenger was a professional tennis tournament played on clay courts. It was the second edition of the tournament which was part of the 2018 ATP Challenger Tour. It took place in Almaty, Kazakhstan between 11 and 16 June 2018.

Singles main-draw entrants

Seeds

 1 Rankings are as of 28 May 2018.

Other entrants
The following players received wildcards into the singles main draw:
  Alen Avidzba
  Timur Khabibulin
  Timofei Skatov
  Denis Yevseyev

The following player received entry into the singles main draw as a special exempt:
  Roberto Cid Subervi

The following players received entry from the qualifying draw:
  Gerard Granollers
  Daniel Masur
  Jurij Rodionov
  Rubin Statham

The following player received entry as a lucky loser:
  Yusuke Takahashi

Champions

Singles

 Jurij Rodionov def.  Peđa Krstin 7–5, 6–2.

Doubles

 Kevin Krawietz /  Andreas Mies def.  Laurynas Grigelis /  Vladyslav Manafov 6–2, 7–6(7–2).

References

2018 ATP Challenger Tour